Lore Hoffmann (born 25 July 1996) is a Swiss middle-distance runner who specialises in the 800 metres. She finished fourth at the 2022 European Championships and fifth at the 2021 European Indoor Championships.

Competition record

Personal bests
 400 metres – 53.44 (La Chaux-de-Fonds 2021)
 400 metres indoor – 54.47 (Magglingen 2021)
 600 metres indoor – 1:31.98 (Magglingen 2020) 
 800 metres – 1:58.50 (Bellinzona 2020)
 800 metres indoor – 2:01.25 (Metz 2022)
 1500 metres – 4:07.09 (Rabat 2022)

References

1996 births
Living people
Swiss female middle-distance runners
Competitors at the 2019 Summer Universiade
Athletes (track and field) at the 2020 Summer Olympics
Olympic athletes of Switzerland